Alligator Creek is a  tributary of the Little Ocmulgee River in the U.S. state of Georgia.

Alligator Creek was named after the American alligator.

See also
List of rivers of Georgia

References 

USGS Hydrologic Unit Map - State of Georgia (1974)

Rivers of Wheeler County, Georgia
Rivers of Telfair County, Georgia
Rivers of Dodge County, Georgia
Rivers of Laurens County, Georgia
Rivers of Georgia (U.S. state)